Luís Xavier Júnior (born 12 October 1907 in Setúbal), is a former Portuguese footballer who played for Vitória Setúbal and Benfica, as a forward.

International career 

Xavier gained 2 caps for the Portugal national team. He made his debut 8 June 1930 in Antwerp against Belgium in a 1-2 defeat.

External links 
 
 

1907 births
Vitória F.C. players
S.L. Benfica footballers
Portugal international footballers
Portuguese footballers
Primeira Liga players
Year of death missing
Association football forwards
Sportspeople from Setúbal